Fedchenko may refer to:

Fedchenko (surname)
Fedchenko Glacier, in Tajikistan, named after Alexei Fedchenko

See also